Tupistra is a genus of about 20 species of flowering plants found in south Asia, from southern China to Sumatra and Ambon Island.  In the APG III classification system, it is placed in the family Asparagaceae, subfamily Nolinoideae (formerly the family Ruscaceae).

Species

, the World Checklist of Selected Plant Families (WCSP) recognized 21 species:

 Tupistra clarkei Hook.f. - Nepal, Sikkim
 Tupistra elegans N.Tanaka - Perak
 Tupistra fungilliformis F.T.Wang & S.Yun Liang - Yunnan, Guangxi
 Tupistra grandis Ridl. - Malaysia
 Tupistra grandistigma F.T.Wang & S.Yun Liang - Guangxi, Yunnan, Vietnam
 Tupistra kressii N.Tanaka - Thailand
 Tupistra laotica N.Tanaka - Laos
 Tupistra malaiana N.Tanaka - Thailand, Malaysia
 Tupistra muricata (Gagnep.) N.Tanaka - Laos, Thailand, Yunnan, Guangxi
 Tupistra nutans Wall. ex Lindl. - Assam, Bangladesh
 Tupistra ochracea (Ridl.) N.Tanaka - Malaysia 
 Tupistra penangensis N.Tanaka - Penang Island
 Tupistra pingbianensis J.L.Huang & X.Z.Liu - Yunnan
 Tupistra robusta N.Tanaka - Perak
 Tupistra squalida Ker Gawl. - Ambon
 Tupistra stoliczana Kurz - Arunachal Pradesh, Assam, Myanmar, Thailand
 Tupistra sumatrensis N.Tanaka - Sumatra
 Tupistra theana Aver. & N.Tanaka - Vietnam
 Tupistra tupistroides (Kunth) Dandy - Sikkim, Bhutan, Assam
 Tupistra urceolata N.Tanaka & W.J.Kress - Thailand
 Tupistra violacea Ridl. - Thailand, Malaysia

According to WCSP, the following are synonyms:

 Tupistra albiflora K.Larsen = T. muricata
 Tupistra longispica Y.Wan & X.H.Lu = T. muricata
 Tupistra veratrifolia Kurz ex Dunn = T. stoliczana
 Tupistra verruculosa Q.H.Chen = Rohdea verruculosa (Q.H.Chen) N.Tanaka

References

Asparagaceae genera
Nolinoideae